The 2004 Meteor Music Awards were held on Monday 1 March 2004, hosted by comedian Dara Ó Briain. It was the fourth edition of Ireland's national music awards. At the ceremony Damien Dempsey was presented with two awards, Best Folk/ Traditional Act and Best Irish Country/Roots Artist. Samantha Mumba made an appearance in a revealing see-through dress, Colin Farrell was pictured with both Bono and Chris Pontius whilst Red Hot Chili Peppers drummer Chad Smith posed with Sharon Corr after both collected awards.  Performers included Lionel Richie, Katie Melua, Counting Crows, The Corrs, Sugababes, Westlife, Hothouse Flowers, The Frames, The Dubliners, Snow Patrol, Paddy Casey and Jerry Fish and the Mudbug Club. Award presenters included Dominic West, Bic Runga and Alex Zane, actors George McMahon and Patrick Bergin, No Frontiers presenter Kathryn Thomas alongside Kerry McFadden, Miss World Rosanna Davison, Keith Duffy, Niall Quinn, Deirdre O'Kane, Denis Hickie, Joe Elliott and Hector Ó hEochagáin. The event was broadcast on RTÉ Two on Wednesday 3 March at 21:00.

Winners 
 Best Irish Radio DJ: Ryan Tubridy
 Ian Dempsey
 Donal Dineen
 Tom Dunne
 Dave Fanning
 John Kelly
 Best Irish Band: The Frames
 Bell X1
 Future Kings of Spain
 The Thrills
 Snow Patrol
 The Tycho Brahe
 Best Irish Pop Act: Westlife
 D-Side
 Hazel Kaneswaran
 Ronan Keating
 Simon Casey
 Best Irish Album: The Thrills, So Much for the City
 Paddy Casey, Living
 Bell X1, Music in Mouth
 Damien Dempsey, Seize the Day
 The Frames, Set List
 David Kitt, Square 1
 Best Irish Female: Cara Dillon
 Moya Brennan
 Carol Keogh
 Róisín Murphy
 Sinéad O'Connor
 Best Irish Male: Paddy Casey
 Damien Dempsey
 Glen Hansard
 Mickey Joe Harte
 David Kitt
 Best Folk/Traditional Act: Damien Dempsey
 Cara Dillon
 Kíla
 Lúnasa
 Sharon Shannon
 Best Irish Country/Roots Artist: Damien Dempsey
 Daniel O'Donnell
 Frank Lane
 Declan Nerney
 Finbar Furey
 Best Irish New Act: Future Kings of Spain
 D-Side
 Woodstar
 Laura Isibor
 Rosey
 Simple Kid
 Best Live Performance: Red Hot Chili Peppers
 David Bowie
 Coldplay
 The Rolling Stones
 Bruce Springsteen
 Justin Timberlake
 Best International Female: Beyoncé
 Britney Spears
 Dido
 Kylie Minogue
 Erin McKeown
 Missy Elliott
 Best International Male: Justin Timberlake
 David Bowie
 Nick Cave
 Justin Hawkins
 Josh Ritter
 Robbie Williams
 Best International Group: The Darkness
 The Black Eyed Peas
 Kings of Leon
 Outkast
 The Strokes
 The White Stripes
 Best International Album: The White Stripes, Elephant
 Radiohead, Hail to the Thief
 Kings of Leon, Youth & Young Manhood
 The Darkness, Permission to Land
 Outkast, Speakerboxxx/The Love Below
 Blur, Think Tank
 Humanitarian Award: Sister Stanislaus Kennedy aka 'Sister Stan'
 Hope for 2004: Republic Of Loose
 Industry Award: Dave Fanning
 Lifetime Achievement Award: The Dubliners

References

External links 
 Official site
 MCD Promotions
 List of winners through the years
 Photos

Meteor Music Awards
Meteor Awards